Renanthera matutina, common name early blooming renanthera, is a species of epiphytic orchid in the genus Renanthera of the family Orchidaceae.

Description
The numerous flowers are pinkish-yellow, with red spots.

Distribution
It occurs from western Indonesia (Thailand, Borneo, Sumatra, Java to Malaysia).

Habitat
This plant requires a warm or intermediate temperature, in full light or partial shade. It grows well in a hanging basket.

References

External links 
 
 
 The Internet Orchid Species Photo Encyclopedia

External links
 Biolib
 Orchids on line

matutina
Orchids of the Philippines